Romania competed at the 2004 Summer Paralympics in Athens, Greece. The team included two athletes, both of them men, and won no medals.

Sports

Cycling

Men's road

Powerlifting

See also
Romania at the Paralympics
Romania at the 2004 Summer Olympics

References 

Nations at the 2004 Summer Paralympics
2004
Summer Paralympics